The recorded history of the Arabs begins in the mid-ninth century BC, which is the earliest known attestation of the Old Arabic language. Tradition holds that Arabs descend from Ishmael, the son of Abraham. The Syrian Desert is the home of the first attested "Arab" groups, as well other Arab groups that spread in the land and existed for millennia.

Before the expansion of the Rashidun Caliphate (632–661), "Arab" referred to any of the largely nomadic or settled Arabic tribes from the Arabian Peninsula, Syrian Desert, North and Lower Mesopotamia. Today, "Arab" refers to a variety of large numbers of people whose native regions form the Arab world due to the spread of Arabs and the Arabic language throughout the region during the early Muslim conquests of the 7th and 8th centuries. The Arabs forged the Rashidun (632–661), Umayyad (661–750) and the Abbasid (750–1258) caliphates, whose borders reached southern France in the west, China in the east, Anatolia in the north, and the Sudan in the south. This was one of the largest land empires in history. In the early 20th century, the First World War signalled the end of the Ottoman Empire; which had ruled much of the Arab world since conquering the Mamluk Sultanate in 1517. This resulted in the defeat and dissolution of the empire and the partition of its territories, forming the modern Arab states. Following the adoption of the Alexandria Protocol in 1944, the Arab League was founded on 22 March 1945. The Charter of the Arab League endorsed the principle of an Arab homeland whilst respecting the individual sovereignty of its member states.

Antiquity

Iron age
Arabs are first mentioned in Biblical and Assyrian texts of the ninth to fifth centuries BC where they appear inhabiting parts of present-day Syria, Saudi Arabia, Jordan, Lebanon and Iraq. Several Arab tribes and towns are identified during the Neo-Assyrian period through their onomastics and toponyms. These tribes were present throughout Mesopotamia and the Syrian Desert, and in many times their presence often accompanied Aramean tribes. When Shalmaneser III descended on Pattin in 858 BC, he fought a force which included two Arab chieftains from tribes of the lower Orontes valley: Bur-'Anat of Yašbuq and Hada[d-ya]ṯa of a tribe whose name is lost.
In the Battle of Qarqar in 853 BC, Gindibu the Arab king of Adummatu was also part of the coalition of the 12 kings who fought the Assyrian invasion of Syria. During the reign of Tiglath-Pileser III, Arabs were reportedly identified in the regions of Tadmor, Homs, Lajat and Beqaa Valley, where Assyrian troops were also attacked by Arab raiders at the time of Sargon II. In fact, Tiglath-Pileser III himself appointed the Sinai peninsula jurisdiction to a certain Arab, Idibi'ilu.

The Nabayatu, likely the predecessors of the Nabataeans, were first mentioned as Arabs in a Babylonian letter from before 648 BC, and reportedly lived in the Babylonian border region. It is possible that the city of Nabatu, which was mentioned in an inscription of Marduk-apla-iddina II (721–710 BC), owes its name to the tribe. During Ashurbanipal's campaigns against Arabs, most Nabayatu clans shifted to the Syrian Desert, and by the 6th century had migrated to the area south of Wadi Sirhan.
During the Siege of Tyre in 332 BC, Alexander fought the Itureans who were identified as 'Arab peasants' living in Mount Lebanon, after they killed some thirty Macedonian soldiers.

Classical kingdoms

Ancient North Arabian texts give a clearer picture of Arabic's developmental history and emergence. Ancient North Arabian is a collection of texts from Jordan, Saudi Arabia and Syria which not only recorded ancient forms of Arabic, such as Safaitic and Hismaic, but also of pre-Arabic languages previously spoken in the Arabian peninsula, such as Dadanitic, Hasaitic and Taymanitic.
The texts are either written in variants or closely related sister scripts of epigraphic south Arabian musnad.

The Nabataeans were nomads who moved into territory vacated by the Edomites – Semitic-speakers who settled the region centuries before them. Their early inscriptions were in Aramaic but gradually switched to their spoken Nabataean Arabic, thus producing some of the earliest clear Arabic texts. The Nabataean alphabet was adopted by Arabs to the south, and evolved into modern Arabic script around the 4th century. This is attested by Safaitic inscriptions (beginning in the 1st century BC) and the many Arabic personal names in Nabataean inscriptions. From about the 2nd century BC, a few inscriptions from Qaryat al-Faw reveal a dialect no longer considered proto-Arabic, but pre-classical Arabic. Five Syriac inscriptions mentioning Arabs have been found at Sumatar Harabesi, one of which dates to the 2nd century AD.

Arabs are first recorded in Palmyra in the late first millennium BC. The soldiers of the sheikh Zabdibel, who aided the Seleucids in the battle of Raphia (217 BC), were described as Arabs; Zabdibel and his men were not actually identified as Palmyrenes in the texts, but the name "Zabdibel" is a Palmyrene name leading to the conclusion that the sheikh hailed from Palmyra. After the Battle of Edessa in 260 CE, the Roman emperor Valerian was taken prisoner. Assuming the side of Rome, the Palmyrenes united under Odaenathus and defeated the Sassanian armies in several battles, even reaching the capital city, Ctesiphon, twice. His son Vaballathus succeeded him in 270 under the regency of his mother Zenobia, who declared the Palmyrene Empire. Zenobia quickly captured most of the Near East, including Egypt and most of Asia Minor in 271, even reaching Ancyra. In 273, Aurelian was able to recover the territories lost to the Palmyrenes, whereby the city capitulated. Aurelian himself was helped by the Arab enemies of Zenobia, the Tanukhids. The Tanukhids initially appear in 196 CE as a federation of Arab tribes roaming the western banks of the Euphrates who later made way into central and northern Syria, where they became part of the foederati of the Romans. They rebelled against Roman authority in 378 CE under their queen, Mavia, who lead her forces into Palestine, Arabia and even the edges of Egypt, and also served as auxiliaries in the Roman army.

The Osroeni Arabs were in possession of the city of Edessa which they had occupied and ruled since the 2nd century BC, and which they had continued to rule until the 3rd century CE. The Kingdom of Hatra was similarly ruled by an Arab dynasty since the 2nd century CE, whose rulers assumed the title malka often in form of "King of the Arabs". The Osroeni and Hatrans were part of several Arab groups or communities in upper Mesopotamia, who also included the Praetavi of Singara (present-day Sinjar, Iraq) reported by Pliny the Elder, and the Arabs of Adiabene. This elaborate Arab presence in upper Mesopotamia was acknowledged by the Sasanians, who called the region Arbayistan, meaning "land of the Arabs".

In the Levant, various Arab groups flourished during the period of Seleucid and Roman rule. To the south of the Taurus range and in the region of Antioch in Coele-Syria, there was an Arab group ruled by a certain Aziz, who played an important role in the affairs of the last Seleucid king Antiochus XIII Asiaticus. To the east of Antioch, there was another Arab group that ruled in Chalcidice represented by the Rhambaei, Gambarus and Themella, who were ruled by way of various Arab princes, including Alchaedamnus who fought with and against the Romans in their wars against Tigranes and against Caesar. Southward in the Orontes river valley, the Emesene Arabs dominated Emesa and Aresutha until the 2nd century, and were involved in the affairs of late Seleucid monarchs under their chief Sempsigeramus. The Itureans, another possibly Arab group known since Alexander the Great's conquests, inhabited the Bekaa valley, Southern Lebanon and the Anti-Lebanon mountains, and from there they expanded into the Phoenician coast, Aurinitis, Trachonitis and Batanaea; they also maintained two capitals, a religious one in Heliopolis and a secular one in Chalcis sub Libanum (modern Anjar, Lebanon). In southern Palestine, the Idumaeans inhabited to the west of the Dead Sea, and after the fall of the Hasmoneans became politically dominant in Palestine and southern Syria with Rome's support for more than a century under Herod the Great.

Arabs were also living in Egypt even in pre-Christian times, in the Ptolemaic nome called Arabia, in Arsinoites across the Nile, and in Thebaid.

Late kingdoms

Several Arab entities flourished during middle and late Antiquity, these included kingdoms and confederations of tribes that dominated large swaths of land in the Arabian Peninsula, Levant and Mesopotamia.

In central Arabia and Iraq, the Lakhmids assumed leadership from the Tanukhids and established themselves as clients for the Sasanians by 300 CE, ruling from their capital city of Al-Hirah and acting as a buffer between them and the Romans & unruly nomadic Arab tribes further south. Their Ghassanid counterparts served the same purpose for the Byzantines after their settlement in Syria likely between 250 and 300 CE. The Ghassanids were part of an influx from Yemen due to conflict between the South Arabian kingdoms of Qataban, Himyar and Sabaa in the 2nd and 3rd centuries CE; it's not clear whether or not Ghassanids originally spoke Arabic or a South Semitic language like the ones spoken in Yemen at the time. Upon their settlement in the Levant around 300 CE, the Ghassanids also became part of the foederati, along with several other Arab tribes in the region including Banu Amilah and Banu Judham.

Greeks and Romans referred to all the nomadic population of the desert in the Near East as Arabi. The Romans called Yemen "Arabia Felix". The Romans called the vassal nomadic states within the Roman Empire Arabia Petraea, after the city of Petra, and called unconquered deserts bordering the empire to the south and east Arabia Magna.

The Kingdom of Kinda was yet another Arab entity in central Arabia, established in 450 CE as a confederation of the Ma'ad tribes ruled by the Kindites. The Kindites originally migrated from Yemen along with the Ghassanids, where they had served as nomad auxiliaries for the armies of the Sabaean and Himyarite kings, but were turned back in Eastern Arabia by the Abdul Qais Rabi'a tribe. They returned to Yemen and allied themselves with the Himyarites who installed them as a vassal kingdom that ruled Central Arabia from "Qaryah Dhat Kahl" (the present-day called Qaryat al-Faw).
The Lakhmids contested control of the Central Arabian tribes with the Kindites with the Lakhmids eventually destroying Kinda in 540 after the fall of their main ally Himyar. The Persian Sassanids dissolved the Lakhmid dynasty in 602, being under puppet kings, then under their direct control.
They ruled much of the Northern/Central Arabian peninsula, until they were destroyed by the Lakhmid king Al-Mundhir, and his son 'Amr.

Medieval period

Rashidun Caliphate (632–661)

United by their new faith after the death of Muhammad in 632, the Rashidun armies launched campaigns of conquest of the surrounding territories controlled by the Sassanians and Romans, effectually establishing what is known in Islamic chronology as the Rashidun Caliphate. The state was centered at the Hejaz, in particular in Medina from 632 until 656 CE, when Ali moved the capital to Kufa.

Umayyad Caliphate (661–750 & 756–1031)

In 661, the Rashidun Caliphate shifted into the hands of the Umayyads, who established their capital in Damascus. The Umayyads derived most of their military from Arabs of Syria, and heavily sponsored poetry. They established garrison towns at Ramla, Raqqa, Basra, Kufa, Mosul and Samarra, all of which developed into major cities.

Caliph Abd al-Malik established Arabic as the Caliphate's official language in 686. This reform greatly influenced the conquered non-Arab peoples and fueled the Arabization of the region. However, the Arabs' higher status among non-Arab Muslim converts and the latter's obligation to pay heavy taxes caused resentment. Caliph Umar II strove to resolve the conflict when he came to power in 717. He rectified the disparity, demanding that all Muslims be treated as equals, but his intended reforms did not take effect, as he died after only three years of rule. By now, discontent with the Umayyads swept the region and an uprising occurred in which the Abbasids came to power and moved the capital to Baghdad.

Umayyads expanded their Empire westwards capturing North Africa from the Byzantines. Before the Arab conquest, North Africa was conquered or settled by various people including Berbers, Punics, Vandals and Romans. After the Abbasid Revolution, the Umayyads lost most of their territories with the exception of Iberia. Their last holding became known as the Emirate of Córdoba. It wasn't until the rule of the grandson of the founder of this new emirate that the state entered a new phase as the Caliphate of Córdoba.  This new state was characterized by an expansion of trade, culture and knowledge, and saw the construction of masterpieces of al-Andalus architecture and the library of Al-Ḥakam II which housed over 400,000 volumes. With the collapse of the Umayyad state in 1031 AD, Islamic Spain was divided into small kingdoms.

Abbasid Caliphate (750–1258 & 1261–1517)

The Abbasids were the descendants of Abbas ibn Abd al-Muttalib, one of the youngest uncles of Muhammad and of the same Banu Hashim clan. The Abbasids led a revolt against the Umayyads and defeated them in the Battle of the Zab effectively ending their rule in all parts of the Empire with the exception of al-Andalus. In 762, the second Abbasid Caliph al-Mansur founded the city of Baghdad and declared it the capital of the Caliphate. Unlike the Umayyads, the Abbasids had the support of non-Arab subjects.

The Islamic Golden Age was inaugurated by the middle of the 8th century by the ascension of the Abbasid Caliphate and the transfer of the capital from Damascus to the newly founded city of Baghdad. The Abbasids were influenced by the Qur'anic injunctions and hadith such as "The ink of the scholar is more holy than the blood of martyrs" stressing the value of knowledge. During this period the Muslim world became an intellectual centre for science, philosophy, medicine and education as the Abbasids championed the cause of knowledge and established the "House of Wisdom" in Baghdad. Rival dynasties such as the Fatimids of Egypt and the Umayyads of al-Andalus were also major intellectual centres with cities such as Cairo and Córdoba rivaling Baghdad.

The Abbasids ruled for 200 years before they lost their central control when Wilayas began to fracture in the 10th century; afterwards, in the 1190s, there was a revival of their power, which was ended by the Mongols, who conquered Baghdad in 1258 and killed the Caliph Al-Musta'sim. Members of the Abbasid royal family escaped the massacre and resorted to Cairo, which had broken from the Abbasid rule two years earlier; the Mamluk generals taking the political side of the kingdom while Abbasid Caliphs were engaged in civil activities and continued patronizing science, arts and literature.

Fatimid Caliphate (909–1171)

The Fatimid caliphate was founded by al-Mahdi Billah, a descendant of Fatimah, the daughter of Muhammad, in the early 10th century. Egypt was the political, cultural, and religious centre of the Fatimid empire. The Fatimid state took shape among the Kutama Berbers, in the West of the North African littoral, in Algeria, in 909 conquering Raqqada, the Aghlabid capital. In 921 the Fatimids established the Tunisian city of Mahdia as their new capital. In 948 they shifted their capital to Al-Mansuriya, near Kairouan in Tunisia, and in 969 they conquered Egypt and established Cairo as the capital of their caliphate.

Intellectual life in Egypt during the Fatimid period achieved great progress and activity, due to many scholars who lived in or came to Egypt, as well as the number of books available. Fatimid Caliphs gave prominent positions to scholars in their courts, encouraged students, and established libraries in their palaces, so that scholars might expand their knowledge and reap benefits from the work of their predecessors. The Fatimids were also known for their exquisite arts. Many traces of Fatimid architecture exist in Cairo today; the most defining examples include the Al-Hakim Mosque and the Al-Azhar University.

It was not until the 11th century that the Maghreb saw a large influx of ethnic Arabs. Starting with the 11th century, the Arab bedouin Banu Hilal tribes migrated to the West. Having been sent by the Fatimids to punish the Berber Zirids for abandoning Shias, they travelled westwards. The Banu Hilal quickly defeated the Zirids and deeply weakened the neighboring Hammadids. According to some modern historians. their influx was a major factor in the arabization of the Maghreb. Although Berbers ruled the region until the 16th century (under such powerful dynasties as the Almoravids, the Almohads, Hafsids, etc.).

Ottoman Empire (1299–1922/1923)

From 1517 to 1918, much of the Arab world was under the suzerainty of the Ottoman Empire. The Ottomans defeated the Mamluk Sultanate in Cairo, and ended the Abbasid Caliphate. Arabs did not feel the change of administration because the Ottomans modeled their rule after the previous Arab administration systems.

In 1911, Arab intellectuals and politicians from throughout the Levant formed al-Fatat ("the Young Arab Society"), a small Arab nationalist club, in Paris. Its stated aim was "raising the level of the Arab nation to the level of modern nations." In the first few years of its existence, al-Fatat called for greater autonomy within a unified Ottoman state rather than Arab independence from the empire. Al-Fatat hosted the Arab Congress of 1913 in Paris, the purpose of which was to discuss desired reforms with other dissenting individuals from the Arab world. However, as the Ottoman authorities cracked down on the organization's activities and members, al-Fatat went underground and demanded the complete independence and unity of the Arab provinces.

After World War I, when the Ottoman Empire was overthrown by the British Empire, former Ottoman colonies were divided up between the British and French as League of Nations mandates.

Modern period

Arabs in modern times live in the Arab world, which comprises 22 countries in Middle East, North Africa, and parts of the Horn of Africa. They are all modern states and became significant as distinct political entities after the fall and defeat and dissolution of the Ottoman Empire.
Arab League was founded in Cairo on 22 March 1945.

References